The Airdrome Dream Classic is a minimalist, high wing, single seat, single engine ultralight aircraft inspired by the 1908 Santos-Dumont Demoiselle and produced in kit form by Airdrome Aeroplanes of Holden, Missouri.

The aircraft is intended for the US FAR 103 Ultralight Vehicles category.

Development
The Dream Classic was designed as a low-cost and very basic ultralight. The fuselage is open and constructed from pop-riveted aluminum tubing. The wing is covered with aircraft fabric and is wire-braced utilizing a kingpost to support the ground loads or optionally strut-braced. The wings can be removed in 20 minutes for trailering. Controls are conventional three-axis, with the elevator and ailerons operated by a side stick.

Two different wings are available, a standard wing of  span and 122 sq ft (11.35 sq m) area and a speed wing of  span and 86 sq ft (8.00 sq m) area.

The standard engine is the  Rotax 447, although engines of  can be used. The manufacturer estimates that a builder will take 100–120 hours to complete this aircraft from the kit. In 2009 the airframe-only kit for the wire-braced version cost US$3495 and US$3995 for the strut-braced version. A completed airframe is also available for an additional US$2000.

By the fall of 2007, 48 wired braced and one strut-braced Dream Classics were flying.

Variants
Dream Classic Standard
Single seat ultralight with  wingspan and 122 sq ft (11.35 sq m) wing area, standard engine  Rotax 447
Dream Classic Speed
Single seat ultralight with  wingspan and 86 sq ft (8.00 sq m) wing area, standard engine  Rotax 447

Specifications (Dream Classic Speed)

See also

References

External links

1990s United States ultralight aircraft